St George's Roman Catholic Church is located in Louisville, Kentucky and is a Neo-Baroque church constructed in 1915. It was listed on the National Register of Historic Places (NRHP) in 1982, and the listing was increased in 1996.

Founding
The first iteration of the parish was chartered in 1897, and a church, rectory and school was constructed along 18th Street in Marysville, later incorporated into Louisville. Due to a rapidly increasing population in the working-class neighborhood, Louisville architect Frederick Erhart was hired to design a Romanesque Revival church that was dedicated in 1910.

The old church was reused for an expansion of the school, which was later augmented with several additions.

1915 Relocation
In 1915, the original rectory was relocated from its original location facing 18th Street to Standard Avenue, and it was given a new foundation and brick veneer. In the place of the original, a larger two-story rectory was constructed, attached to the church by a central corridor.

Population in the region contained to swell, so construction was completed on a new, three-level catholic school in 1923 along Standard Avenue. The school was expanded with a two-story addition in 1935, which included the completion of a smokestack and boiler, and two small, attached sheds.

1925 Relocation
Two years later, the Dixie Highway, later known as U.S. Route 31W, was established along 18th Street. The new designation brought forth additional traffic, and the roadway was widened to four-lanes. In addition, the Louisville & Nashville Railroad eliminated multiple at-grade crossings and replaced them with underpasses. As a result, the church property was affected and the building was relocated to face Standard Avenue in October.

Continued growth in the neighborhood necessitated another expansion for the church, however, World War II delayed any construction until the war was resolved. In 1947, the expansion, a gymnasium and classroom complex, was completed in two stages that was finished in the following year. The final construction project was the completion of a two-story convent in 1959.

The church was moved at some point. The NRHP listing was increased in 1996 to include a rectory and additional buildings.

See also
 Saint George: Devotions, traditions and prayers

Further reading
St. George's Roman Catholic Church at Abandoned

References

Roman Catholic churches completed in 1909
National Register of Historic Places in Louisville, Kentucky
Roman Catholic churches in Louisville, Kentucky
Renaissance Revival architecture in Kentucky
Churches on the National Register of Historic Places in Kentucky
20th-century Roman Catholic church buildings in the United States
Relocated buildings and structures in Kentucky
1909 establishments in Kentucky
Clergy houses